Charles Spencer Belden (April 21, 1904 – November 3, 1954) was an American screenwriter and journalist, known for writing screenplays to several Charlie Chan films in the 1930s, notably Charlie Chan at the Opera (1936).  His 1932 short story "The Wax Works" served as the basis for the 1933 film Mystery of the Wax Museum. He was married to stage actress Beth Milton in the early 1930s and to actress Joan Marsh who had starred in Charlie Chan on Broadway (1937), from 1938 to 1943. He was born in Montclair, New Jersey, and died in the Motion Picture Country Hospital, Los Angeles, at the age of 50.

References

External links

1904 births
1954 deaths
American male screenwriters
People from Montclair, New Jersey
Screenwriters from New Jersey
20th-century American male writers
20th-century American screenwriters